Saint Constant was an Irish priest and hermit, who was martyred in 777 AD.  His feast is celebrated on 18 November.

References

Medieval Irish saints
8th-century Irish priests